
Gmina Międzyrzecz is an urban-rural gmina (administrative district) in Międzyrzecz County, Lubusz Voivodeship, in western Poland.

Neighbouring gminas
Gmina Międzyrzecz is bordered by the gminas of Bledzew, Lubrza, Przytoczna, Pszczew, Sulęcin, Świebodzin and Trzciel.

Villages
Apart from the town of Międzyrzecz, the gmina contains the villages of Bobowicko, Brzozowy Ług, Bukowiec, Głębokie, Gorzyca, Jagielnik, Jeleniogłowy, Kaława, Kalsko, Karolewo, Kęszyca, Kęszyca Leśna, Kęszyca-Kolonia, Kolonia Nietoperek, Kolonia Żółwin, Kuligowo, Kursko, Kuźnik, Kwiecie, Łęgowskie, Lubosinek, Marianowo, Międzyrzecz-Wybudowanie, Nietoperek, Pieski, Pniewo, Rojewo, Skoki, Święty Wojciech, Szumiąca, Wojciechówek, Wysoka, Wyszanowo, Zamostowo and Żółwin.

Twin towns – sister cities

Gmina Międzyrzecz is twinned with:

 Andrésy, France (2005)
 Bad Freienwalde, Germany (2001)
 Charlottenburg-Wilmersdorf (Berlin), Germany (1993)
 Haren, Germany (1991)
 Westerwolde, Netherlands (1991)

References

External links
Official website of the town and municipality 
Official website of the town office 

Miedzyrzecz
Międzyrzecz County